Bayford railway station serves the villages of Bayford and Brickendon in Hertfordshire, England.

Services
All services at Bayford are operated by Great Northern using  EMUs.

The typical off-peak service in trains per hour is:
 2 tph to 
 2 tph to  via 

During the peak hours, the service runs between Moorgate and Hertford North only.

References

External links

Railway stations in Hertfordshire
DfT Category F2 stations
Former London and North Eastern Railway stations
Railway stations in Great Britain opened in 1924
Railway stations in Great Britain closed in 1973
Railway stations in Great Britain opened in 1973
Railway stations served by Govia Thameslink Railway
1924 establishments in England